Guillaume de Dammartin was a 15th-century French architect. He is best known for designing the original plan of Nantes Cathedral in Brittany and commenced the building in 1434.

References

External links 
 Guillaume de Dammartin on Structurae

15th-century French architects
Year of birth missing
Year of death missing